Nothing but Trouble may refer to:

Film
Nothing but Trouble (1918 film), starring Harold Lloyd
Nothing but Trouble (1944 film), a Laurel and Hardy production
Nothing but Trouble (1991 film), directed by Dan Aykroyd

Music
Nothin' But Trouble (Blue Murder album)
Nothin' But Trouble (Nia Peeples album)
"Nothing but Trouble" (song), a 2015 song by Lil Wayne and Charlie Puth
"Nothing but Trouble", Eddie Boyd Blues Combo 1961

Other
Nothing but Trouble: A Kevin Kerney Novel, by Michael McGarrity

See also
"Girls Ain't Nothing but Trouble", the debut single by DJ Jazzy Jeff and the Fresh Prince